Cartoon Network Shorts Department is the channel's artist development program for animated pilots that are created at Cartoon Network Studios. It was inaugurated and started in 2013 through online uploading of six titles, on May 21 for a short period, which three of them has been greenlit for a TV series at the start of the program.

The short Mushroom and the Forest of the World was nominated for an Daytime Emmy Award for Outstanding Short Format Children's Program.

List of pilots

United States

International
Since 2016, the program has begun to expand to other countries where Cartoon Network Studios accept to commission (but not produce) those local short pilots, and the first title to be noticed in this process is Lasso & Comet.

See also
 Nickelodeon Animated Shorts Program - the Nickelodeon counterpart of the program.

Notes

References

External links
 CN Minis playlist on YouTube
 Shorts Department on Cartoon Network Studios website

Cartoon Network
American animated short films
2013 establishments